This article is a list of diseases of common bean (Phaseolus vulgaris).

Bacterial diseases

Fungal diseases

Nematodes, parasitic

Viral diseases

References
Common Bean Diseases (Fact Sheets and Information Bulletins), The Cornell Plant Pathology Vegetable Disease Web Page
Common Names of Plant Diseases, The International Society for Molecular Plant-Microbe Interactions
 Common bean diseases, EMBRAPA
 Main common bean diseases and their control, EMBRAPA with photos

Common bean